Lionel M. Malamed (November 15, 1924–September 17, 1989) was an American professional basketball player.

A 5'9" guard from the City College of New York, Lionel played one season (1948–49) in the National Basketball Association as a member of the Indianapolis Jets and Rochester Royals. He averaged 5.9 points in 44 games.

Malamed later worked in Wall Street and served as vice president of Herbert Young & Company. He died of a heart attack at the age of 64. He was survived by his wife and two sons.

BAA career statistics

Regular season

See also
 List of shortest players in National Basketball Association history

References

External links
 

1924 births
1989 deaths
American Basketball League (1925–1955) players
American men's basketball players
CCNY Beavers men's basketball players
Guards (basketball)
Indianapolis Jets players
James Monroe High School (New York City) alumni
Rochester Royals players